Gajjalakonda is a village in Markapur Mandal, Prakasam District of Andhra Pradesh State, India.

Grama Panchayat

Shri. has been elected as sarpanch for Gajjalakonda Grama Panchayat for 5 years. His tenure will end on 1 August 2018.

Elected members of Gajjalakonda Village to local body for the term of 5 Years i.e., from 2 August 2013, to 1 August 2018.

Demographics

Gajjalakonda is a large village located in Markapur of Prakasam district, Andhra Pradesh with total 1093 families residing. The Gajjalakonda village has population of 4567 of which 2388 are males while 2179 are females as per Population Census 2011.

In Gajjalakonda village population of children with age 0-6 is 502 which makes up 10.99% of total population of village. Average Sex Ratio of Gajjala Konda village is 912 which is lower than Andhra Pradesh state average of 993. Child Sex Ratio for the Gajjala Konda as per census is 880, lower than Andhra Pradesh average of 939.

Gajjalakonda village has lower literacy rate compared to Andhra Pradesh. In 2011, literacy rate of Gajjala Konda village was 56.14% compared to 67.02% of Andhra Pradesh. In Gajjala Konda Male literacy stands at 69.21% while female literacy rate was 41.87%.

References

External links
 Gajjalakonda Grama Panchayat

See also
 Markapur
 Prakasam District

Villages in Prakasam district